The al Thowarah hot spring, also called the Nakhal spring, is located a few kilometres from the Nakhal Fort in Oman, located off the road that connects Birka with Rustaq. It is a green area where a spring forms a stream in a wadi (valley). 

It is one of the sites featured in a series of Oman landscape paintings by British artist Alan Reed.

See also
List of hot springs

References

Geography of Oman
Hot springs
Nakhal